Guitar is the title of a recording by American folk and blues guitarist Peter Lang, released in 2003. It was recorded entirely on 12-string guitar.

The title "Snaker Ray Has Come & Gone" refers to St. Paul, Minnesota musician Dave "Snaker" Ray of the folk-blues trio Koerner, Ray & Glover.

Reception

Allmusic reviewer Thom Jurek states in his review: "This is guitar music that matters because it is played not only with technical acumen and a sense of history, but with an aesthetic that celebrates and pushes the tradition in new directions."

Track listing
All songs by Peter Lang.
 "Little Cairo" – 5:03
 "After the Fall" – 5:19
 "Come Along Joe" – 1:48
 "John Hurt in the 21st Century" – 3:01
 "I Should Have Known" – 1:48
 "Brick House Blues" – 2:55
 "Snaker Ray Has Come & Gone" – 4:08
 "Emily's Waltz" – 2:45
 "Daylight Is Darkness" – 2:41
 "Witness to the Messenger" – 8:37
 "All Through My Life" – 12:34

Personnel
Peter Lang – guitar, engineer, cover art, liner notes

References

2003 albums
Peter Lang (guitarist) albums